Below are lists of schools in New South Wales:

 List of government schools in New South Wales
 List of non-government schools in New South Wales
 List of selective high schools in New South Wales

 By region
 List of schools in Greater Western Sydney
 List of schools in Hunter and the Central Coast
 List of schools in Illawarra and the South East
 List of schools in Northern Rivers and Mid North Coast
 List of schools in the Riverina
 List of schools in Tamworth

 By religion
 List of Catholic schools in New South Wales
 List of Anglican schools in New South Wales
 List of Islamic schools in New South Wales

See also 
 Lists of schools in Australia
 List of universities in Australia

 
Lists